Jorasanko Assembly constituency is a Legislative Assembly constituency of Kolkata district in the Indian state of West Bengal.

Overview
As per orders of the Delimitation Commission, No. 165 Jorasanko Assembly constituency is composed of the following:  22, 23, 25, 27, 37, 38, 39, 40, 41, 42 and 43 of Kolkata Municipal Corporation.

Jorasanko Assembly constituency is part of No. 24 Kolkata Uttar (Lok Sabha constituency). Prior to the 2009 Indian general election it was part of Calcutta North West (Lok Sabha constituency).

Members of Legislative Assembly

Election results

2021

2016

2011

References

Assembly constituencies of West Bengal
Politics of Kolkata district